Campo Santi Giovanni e Paolo is a city square in Venice, Italy.

Buildings around the square
Santi Giovanni e Paolo, Venice
Statue of Bartolomeo Colleoni

Piazzas and campos in Venice